The Hochhaus Süddeutscher Verlag (short: SV-Hochhaus) in the quarter of Berg am Laim in Munich serves as headquarters of the Süddeutscher Verlag which publishes the Süddeutsche Zeitung.

The skyscraper by architect Oliver Kühn was initially planned with a height of 145 meters but had to be rescheduled after himself has expressed a Munich petition for a height limit of 99 meters outside the Middle Ring. The tower has now reached an official building height of 99.95 meters. The building has 28 above-ground floors. Overall, it has a gross floor area of 78,400 sqm, with 51,200 m² are above ground and 27,200 meters underground. Since the gross floor area should change by the reprogramming did not, was the high-rise, although much lower, but a lot wider than the original draft. In the basement, a garage is provided with 553 parking spaces. The building was constructed with a delay from 2006 to 2007 and reaches only 103 meters (99,95 meters without the superstructures).

On the opposite side of the street is Hultschiner since 1985, the printing of the publisher.

The first stone was laid on May 19, 2006. In December 2007 the Süddeutsche Verlag sold the building to the Munich-based pre-REIT company Prime Office and rented it back for 15 years. In November 2008 the business was transferred from the publisher of the Black House in Munich's old town in the high-rise. The publisher is concentrated where 1850 jobs.

External links 

 official site 

Buildings and structures completed in 2007
Buildings and structures in Munich
Towers in Germany
Newspaper headquarters
Tourist attractions in Munich
Skyscrapers in Munich
Skyscraper office buildings in Germany